Trzebiec  (German: NEuhof) is a village in the administrative district of Gmina Tychowo, within Białogard County, West Pomeranian Voivodeship, in north-western Poland.

The village has an approximate population of 90.

See also
History of Pomerania

References

Trzebiec